The 1971–72 ABA season was the fifth season of the American Basketball Association.   The Indiana Pacers won the championship, defeating the New York Nets, 4 games to 2, in the ABA Finals.

For the first time in the league's history, no franchise moved to a different state from the previous season.  The only name change involved the Dallas Chaparrals , who were able to secure a lease in Dallas for the season and were re-named from the previous season's Texas Chaparrals.

Standings

Eastern Division

Western Division

Asterisk (*) denotes playoff team

Bold – ABA Champions

Playoffs

Awards and honors

 ABA Most Valuable Player Award: Artis Gilmore, Kentucky Colonels
 Rookie of the Year: Artis Gilmore, Kentucky Colonels
 Coach of the Year: Tom Nissalke, Dallas Chaparrals
 Playoffs MVP: Freddie Lewis, Indiana Pacers
 All-Star Game MVP: Dan Issel, Kentucky Colonels
All-ABA First Team 
 Dan Issel, Kentucky Colonels (1st First Team selection, 2nd overall selection)
 Rick Barry, New York Nets (4th selection)
 Artis Gilmore, Kentucky Colonels
 Donnie Freeman, Dallas Chaparrals (1st First Team selection, 4th overall selection)
 Bill Melchionni, New York Nets
All-ABA Second Team
 Willie Wise, Utah Stars
 Julius Erving, Virginia Squires
 Zelmo Beaty, Utah Stars (2nd selection)
 Ralph Simpson, Denver Rockets
 Charlie Scott, Virginia Squires
All-ABA Rookie Team
 Julius Erving, Virginia Squires
 Artis Gilmore, Kentucky Colonels
 George McGinnis, Indiana Pacers 
 Johnny Neumann, Memphis Pros
 John Roche, New York Nets

References

 
ABA